Jannik Skov Hansen (born 5 January 1993) is a Danish professional footballer who plays as a winger.

Club career
Hansen spent his early career with Brøndby and HB Køge. In July 2016, after a spell with Rishøj BK, he signed for HIK. He next played for Skovshoved before signing for Randers in January 2018. He was released by Randers in January 2019, following just one appearance and a number of injuries.

In 2019, Skov Hansen joined AB. He left the club at the end of the season. In 2020 he joined Vordingborg IF in the Denmark Series. 

After a spell at FC Roskilde in 2021, Hansen moved to Holbæk B&I in March 2022.

International career
Hansen represented Denmark at youth international level from under-16 to under-19 levels.

Personal life
In March 2018, Hansen talked about the depression and suicidal thoughts he had experienced earlier in his career.

References

1993 births
Living people
Danish men's footballers
Brøndby IF players
HB Køge players
Køge Nord FC players
Hellerup IK players
Skovshoved IF players
Randers FC players
Akademisk Boldklub players
FC Roskilde players
Holbæk B&I players
Danish Superliga players
Danish 2nd Division players
Danish 1st Division players
Association football wingers
Denmark youth international footballers